31g           The men's 4 × 100 metre freestyle relay competition at the 2014 Pan Pacific Swimming Championships took place on August 23 at the Gold Coast Aquatic Centre. The last champion was the United States.

This race consisted of eight lengths of the pool. Each of the four swimmers completed two lengths of the pool. The first swimmer had to touch the wall before the second could leave the starting block.

Records
Prior to this competition, the existing world and Pan Pacific records were as follows:

Results
All times are in minutes and seconds.

Heats
Heats weren't performed, as only seven teams had entered.

Final 
The final was held on August 23, at 21:19.

References

2014 Pan Pacific Swimming Championships